David Greene (born April 9, 1976) is an American journalist who worked for the radio broadcasting company NPR, and was one of the co-hosts of Morning Edition until his retirement in December 2020.  On July 29, 2022 he became the host of Left, Right & Center.

Early life
Greene is the son of Douglas A. Greene and the late Terry Rockmaker Greene.  He spent his youth in Pittsburgh, Pennsylvania, where he lived in the Shadyside neighborhood and attended Fanny Edel Falk Laboratory School through the fifth grade.  In 1986, he moved with his family to Murray, Kentucky, where he attended Murray Middle School for two years.  He graduated from J. P. McCaskey High School in Lancaster, Pennsylvania in 1994.  His first "radio" show was doing the morning announcements at his high school.

Career
After graduating from Harvard University (where he was an editor of the Harvard Crimson) with a degree in government in 1998, Greene became a reporter for The Baltimore Sun.  Among other assignments, including an early stint in local reporting, he covered the White House for George W. Bush's first term.

In 2005, Greene joined NPR and continued to cover the Bush White House.  From 2010-12, he was a foreign correspondent for NPR based in Moscow, and in 2012 joined Morning Edition.  His reporting from Moscow, including a return in 2013 to travel the Trans-Siberian Railway, led to his first book, Midnight in Siberia, in 2014.

In 2011, Greene received the Daniel Schorr Journalism Prize for his work in Tripoli during the Arab Spring.
Greene announced his retirement from NPR in October 2020, with his last Morning Edition broadcast being on December 29, 2020.

Personal life
Greene's mother was an associate professor of psychology at Franklin & Marshall College in Lancaster, Pennsylvania for 17 years, and died in 2006.  David Greene received an honorary doctorate from the college in 2008, where he spoke at the college's commencement and celebrated his mother's life and career.

Greene is married to Rose Previte, who grew up in Ada, Ohio.  They married in 2007.  In 2014, she opened the "Compass Rose" restaurant in Washington, D.C., where they live.

References

American radio journalists
Living people
NPR personalities
People from Lancaster, Pennsylvania
Writers from Pittsburgh
1976 births
The Harvard Crimson people
The Baltimore Sun people